The seven Bristol and Exeter Railway 2-2-2WT locomotives were small 2-2-2 well tank locomotives designed by James Pearson for working branch lines such as those to Tiverton and Clevedon, as well as acting as pilot locomotives at Bristol.  The first was delivered in 1851, and the last withdrawn in 1880.

On 1 January 1876, the Bristol and Exeter Railway was amalgamated with the Great Western Railway, after which the surviving locomotives were given new numbers.

 R. B. Longridge and Company
 30 (1851 – 1876)
 31 (1851 – 1877) GWR No. 2054
 E. B. Wilson and Company
 32 (1851 – 1878) GWR No. 2055
 33 (1851 – 1876)
 34 (1851 – 1875)
 Rothwell and Company (14½ inch cylinders)
 57 (1859 – 1877) GWR No. 2056
 58 (1859 – 1880) GWR No. 2057

References 
 
 

Broad gauge (7 feet) railway locomotives
2-2-2WT locomotives
Bristol and Exeter Railway locomotives
Railway locomotives introduced in 1851
Scrapped locomotives